James Connolly (5 June 1868 – 12 May 1916) was an Irish republican, socialist, and trade union leader. Born to Irish parents in the Cowgate area of Edinburgh, Scotland, Connolly left school for working life at the age of 11, and became involved in socialist politics in the 1880s.

Although mainly known for his position in Irish socialist and republican politics, he also took a role in Scottish and American politics. He was a member of the Industrial Workers of the World and founder of the Irish Socialist Republican Party. With James Larkin, he was centrally involved in the Dublin lock-out of 1913, as a result of which the two men formed the Irish Citizen Army (ICA) that year; they also founded the Irish Labour Party along with William O'Brien. Connolly was the long term right-hand man to Larkin in the Irish Transport and General Workers' Union (ITGWU) until taking over leadership of both the union and its military wing the ICA upon Larkin's departure for the United States, then leading both until his death.

He opposed British rule in Ireland, and was one of the leaders of the Easter Rising of 1916, commanding the Irish Citizen Army throughout. Following the defeat of the Easter Rising and the arrest of the majority of its leaders, he was taken to Kilmainham Gaol and executed by firing squad for his part in its proceedings.

Early life
Connolly was born in an Edinburgh slum in 1868, the third son of Irish parents John Connolly and Mary McGinn. His parents had moved to Scotland from County Monaghan, Ireland, and settled in the Cowgate, a ghetto where thousands of Irish people lived. He spoke with a Scottish accent throughout his life.

He was born in St Patrick's Roman Catholic parish, in the Cowgate district of Edinburgh known as "Little Ireland". His father and grandfathers were labourers. He had an education up to the age of about ten in the local Catholic primary school. He left and worked in labouring jobs. Owing to the economic difficulties he was having, like his eldest brother John, he joined the British Army.

He enlisted at age 14, falsifying his age and giving his name as Reid, as his brother John had done. He served in Ireland with the 2nd Battalion of the Royal Scots Regiment and King's Regiment (Liverpool) for nearly seven years, during a turbulent period in rural areas known as the Land War. He would later become involved in the land issue.

He developed a deep hatred for the British Army that lasted his entire life. When he heard that his regiment was being transferred to India, he deserted.

Connolly had another reason for staying: his future wife Lillie Reynolds. Lillie moved to Scotland with James after he left the army, and they married in April 1890. They settled in Edinburgh. There, Connolly became involved with the Scottish Socialist Federation.

Connolly briefly established a cobbler's shop in 1895 to provide for his family, but the shop failed after a few months because of his insufficient shoe-mending skills. He was increasingly active within the socialist movement and prioritized it over cobbling.

Socialist involvement

In the 1880s, Connolly became influenced by Friedrich Engels and Karl Marx and would later advocate a type of socialism that was based in Marxist theory. Connolly described himself as a socialist, while acknowledging the influence of Marx. He is credited with setting the groundwork for Christian socialism in Ireland.

He became secretary of the Scottish Socialist Federation. At the time his brother John was secretary; after John spoke at a rally in favour of the eight-hour day, however, he was fired from his job with the Edinburgh Corporation, so while he looked for work, James took over as secretary. During this time, Connolly became involved with the Independent Labour Party which Keir Hardie had formed in 1893. At some time during this period, he took up the study of, and advocated the use of, the neutral international language, Esperanto. A short story, called The Agitator’s Wife, which appeared in the Labour Prophet, a short lived Christian Socialist journal, has been attributed to Connolly. His interest in Esperanto is implicit in his 1898 article "The Language Movement", which primarily attempts to promote socialism to the nationalist revolutionaries involved in the Gaelic Revival.

By 1893 he was involved in the Scottish Socialist Federation, acting as its secretary from 1895. Two months after the birth of his third daughter, word came to Connolly that the Dublin Socialist Club was looking for a full-time secretary, a job that offered a salary of a pound a week. Connolly and his family moved to Dublin, where he took up the position. At his instigation, the club quickly evolved into the Irish Socialist Republican Party (ISRP). 

While active as a socialist in Great Britain, Connolly was the founding editor of The Socialist newspaper and was among the founders of the Socialist Labour Party which split from the Social Democratic Federation in 1903. Connolly joined Maud Gonne and Arthur Griffith in the Dublin protests against the Boer War.

America

A combination of frustration with the progress of the ISRP and economic necessity caused him to emigrate to the United States in September 1903, with no plans as to what he would do there. While in America he was a member of the Socialist Labor Party of America (1906), the Socialist Party of America (1909) and the Industrial Workers of the World, and founded the Irish Socialist Federation in New York, 1907. He became the editor of the Free Press, a socialist weekly newspaper that was published in New Castle, Lawrence county, Pennsylvania from 25 July 1908 and discontinued in 1913. He famously had a chapter of his 1910 book Labour in Irish History entitled "A chapter of horrors: Daniel O’Connell and the working class." critical of the achiever of Catholic Emancipation 60 years earlier.

Return to Ireland

On Connolly's return to Ireland in 1910 he was right-hand man to James Larkin in the Irish Transport and General Workers Union. He stood twice for the Wood Quay ward of Dublin Corporation but was unsuccessful. His name, and those of his family, appears in the 1911 Census of Ireland – his occupation is listed as "National Organiser Socialist Party". In 1911, Connolly wrote a piece titled decrying George V's upcoming coronation tour visit to Ireland, advocating that "public ownership must take the place of capitalist ownership, social democracy replace political and social inequality, the sovereignty of labour must supersede and destroy the sovereignty of birth and the monarchy of capitalism".

1913 Dublin lock-out, forming the ICA and Labour Party

In 1913, in response to the Dublin lock-out, he, along with James Larkin and an ex-British officer, Jack White, founded the Irish Citizen Army (ICA), an armed and well-trained body of labour men whose aim was to defend workers and strikers, particularly from the frequent brutality of the Dublin Metropolitan Police. Though they only numbered about 250 at most, their goal soon became the establishment of an independent and socialist Irish nation. With Larkin and William O'Brien, Connolly also founded the Irish Labour Party as the political wing of the Irish Trades Union Congress in 1912 and was a member of its National Executive. He was editor of The Irish Worker which was suppressed under the Defence of the Realm Act 1914. Around this time he met Winifred Carney in Belfast, who became his secretary and would later accompany him during the Easter Rising. Like Vladimir Lenin, Connolly opposed the First World War explicitly from a socialist perspective. Rejecting the Redmondite position, he declared "I know of no foreign enemy of this country except the British Government."

Easter Rising

Connolly and the ICA made plans for an armed uprising during World War I, independently of the Irish Volunteers. In early 1916, believing the Irish Volunteers were dithering, he attempted to goad them into action by threatening to send the ICA against the British Empire alone, if necessary. This alarmed the members of the Irish Republican Brotherhood, who had already infiltrated the Volunteers and had plans for an insurrection that very year. In order to talk Connolly out of any such rash action, the IRB leaders, including Tom Clarke and Patrick Pearse, met with Connolly to see if an agreement could be reached. During the meeting, the IRB and the ICA agreed to act together at Easter of that year.

During the Easter Rising, beginning on 24 April 1916, Connolly was Commandant of the Dublin Brigade. As the Dublin Brigade had the most substantial role in the rising, he was de facto commander-in-chief. Connolly's leadership in the Easter rising was considered formidable. Michael Collins said of Connolly that he "would have followed him through hell."

Following the surrender, he said to other prisoners: "Don't worry. Those of us that signed the proclamation will be shot. But the rest of you will be set free."

Death

Connolly was not actually held in gaol, but in a room (now called the "Connolly Room") at the State Apartments in Dublin Castle, which had been converted to a first-aid station for troops recovering from the war.

Connolly was sentenced to death by firing squad for his part in the rising. On 12 May 1916, he was taken by military ambulance to Royal Hospital Kilmainham, across the road from Kilmainham Gaol, and from there taken to the gaol, where he was to be executed. While Connolly was still in hospital in Dublin Castle, during a visit from his wife and daughter, he said: "The Socialists will not understand why I am here; they forget I am an Irishman."

Connolly had been so badly injured from the fighting (a doctor had already said he had no more than a day or two to live, but the execution order was still given) that he was unable to stand before the firing squad; he was carried to a prison courtyard on a stretcher. His absolution and last rites were administered by a Capuchin, Father Aloysius Travers. Asked to pray for the soldiers about to shoot him, he said: "I will say a prayer for all men who do their duty according to their lights." Instead of being marched to the same spot where the others had been executed, at the far end of the execution yard, he was tied to a chair and then shot.

His body (along with those of the other leaders) was put in a mass grave without a coffin. The executions of the rebel leaders deeply angered the majority of the Irish population, most of whom had shown no support during the rebellion. It was Connolly's execution that caused the most controversy. Historians have pointed to the manner of execution of Connolly and similar rebels, along with their actions, as being factors that caused public awareness of their desires and goals and gathered support for the movements that they had died fighting for.

The executions were not well received, even throughout Britain, and drew unwanted attention from the United States, which the British Government was seeking to bring into the war in Europe. H. H. Asquith, the Prime Minister, ordered that no more executions were to take place; an exception being that of Roger Casement, who was charged with high treason and had not yet been tried.

Although he abandoned religious practice in the 1890s, he turned back to Roman Catholicism in the days before his execution.

Political views

Syndicalism
Connolly was not simply a socialist, but specifically was a Syndicalist. Syndicalism is a form of socialism which espouses the idea that socialism will come about through the mass action of trade unions, and that in a socialist society the unions will control the means of production. Connolly's syndicalism was developed through his interactions with Daniel DeLeon, the Industrial Workers of the World, and Jim Larkin. Although Connolly himself dabbled in electoral politics, he came to lean towards the syndicalist viewpoint that the most effective way for workers to gain power was through strikes. Connolly was also a supporter of the syndicalist and IWW view that workers should organise themselves into "One Big Union". 

Connolly and DeLeon often clashed on a number of points; one point, in particular, was that Connolly rejected DeLeon's contention that every nominal wage increase gained by workers would be quickly and exactly offset by a corresponding increase in prices, with Connolly's arguing that Karl Marx himself had rejected this notion. Connolly suggested that endorsing the idea that wage increases were meaningless would result in socialists never fighting to improve the conditions of workers.   

In 1914, Connolly published the book Labour in Irish History in which he analysed Irish history from a Marxist perspective. In the book, Connolly argues that prior to the British colonisation of Ireland, the Irish lived in a form of stateless communism. The book also criticised Daniel O'Connell and his work towards Catholic emancipation on the grounds that the result only uplifted the Catholic bourgeois and not Catholics as a whole.   

Connolly envisioned the Industrial Workers of the World forming their own political party which would bring together the feuding socialist groups such as the Socialist Labor Party of America and the Socialist Party of America. Likewise, he envisaged independent Ireland as a socialist republic. His connection and views on Revolutionary Unionism and Syndicalism have raised debate on if his image for a workers republic would be one of State or Grassroots socialism. For a time he was involved with De Leonism and the Second International until he later broke with both.

Religion
Over the course of his political lifetime, Connolly maintained that there was no inherent conflict between religion and socialism, although he personally was an atheist for much of his life. Connolly held that socialists should campaign on economic and political issues alone, and completely avoid debating spirituality, particularly with clergy. Connolly saw attacking religion as a strategic and tactical mistake for socialists, bogging them down in an unnecessary conflict. He also believed that any religion that promoted egalitarianism and humanitarianism could, in fact, aid the introduction of socialism.  In 1910 Connolly wrote the pamphlet Labour, nationality and religion in which he specifically outlined his view that Socialism and Catholicism were not incompatible.

Another point Connolly and DeLeon differed on was marriage; Connolly believed strictly in monogamy while DeLeon was willing to entertain the notion of polyamorous marriages.

Nationalism

The historian Fergus D'arcy has argued that prior to his return to Ireland in 1910, Connolly was not particularly concerned with the ideological idea of nationalism, but living in Ireland forced Connolly to grapple with the "national question". In 1911, Connolly entered into a public debate with Belfast socialist William Walker. Walker argued that socialism in Ireland would only come about if Ireland remained a part of the United Kingdom, and stated he was an "Internationalist", not a nationalist. Connolly rebutted with his belief that "the only true socialist internationalism lay in a free federation of free peoples". 

Although Connolly committed himself and his Irish Citizen Army to the Easter Rising, he remained wary of the Irish nationalists he was aligning himself with. A week before the Easter Rising, he reportedly told members of the ICA "in the event of victory, hold on to your rifles, as those with whom we are fighting may stop before our goal is reached. We are out for economic as well as political liberty".

In Scotland, Connolly's thinking influenced socialists such as John Maclean, who would, like him, combine his leftist thinking with nationalist ideas when he formed the Scottish Workers Republican Party.

Feminism
Connolly had a particular concern with the role of women in society. In 1915, Connolly wrote in the Reconquest of Ireland that "The worker is the slave of capitalist society, the female worker is the slave of that slave" and "of what use...can be the re-establishment of any form of Irish state if it does not embody the emancipation of womanhood?". Connolly supported the Suffragette movement, and Francis Sheehy-Skeffington opined that Connolly was "the soundest and most thorough-going feminist among all the Irish labour men". Connolly suggested the oppression of women was a consequence of private property. Connolly held the view that it was not the role of men to liberate women, but for women to liberate themselves with the help of supporting men.

Personal life
James Connolly and his wife Lillie had seven children. Nora became an influential writer and campaigner within the Irish-republican movement as an adult. Roddy continued his father's politics. In later years, both became members of the Oireachtas (Irish parliament). Moira became a doctor and married Richard Beech. One of Connolly's daughters, Mona, died in 1904 aged 13, when she burned herself while she did the washing for an aunt.

Three months after James Connolly's execution his wife was received into the Catholic Church, at Church St. on 15 August.

Legacy
Connolly's legacy in Ireland is mainly due to his contribution to the republican cause; his legacy as a socialist has been claimed by a variety of left-wing and left-republican groups, and he is also associated with the Labour Party which he founded. Connolly was among the few European members of the Second International who opposed, outright, World War I. This put him at odds with most of the socialist leaders of Europe.

Connolly has been referred and referenced as a "political idol' for a number of trade unionists, such as Mike Quill and Mick Lynch

Tributes
 In 1928, Follonsby miners' lodge in the Durham coalfield unfurled a newly designed banner that included a portrait of Connolly on it. The banner was burned in 1938, replaced but then painted over in 1940. A reproduction of the 1938 Connolly banner was commissioned in 2011 by the Follonsby Miners' Lodge Banner Association and it is regularly paraded at various events in County Durham ('Old King Coal' at Beamish Open Air museum, 'The Seven men of Jarrow' commemoration every June, the Durham Miners' Gala every second Saturday in July, the Tommy Hepburn annual memorial every October), in the wider UK and Ireland.
 Connolly Books, a leftist bookstore in Dublin which was established in 1932, is named after Connolly.
 The Connolly Association, a British organisation which formed in 1938 and campaigns for Irish unity and independence, is named after Connolly.
 Connolly and the events of his death are mentioned in the fourth verse of the 1958 song "The Patriot Game" by Irish songwriter Dominic Behan (this verse is sometimes omitted from renditions of the song).
 In 1968, Irish group The Wolfe Tones released a single named "James Connolly", which reached number 15 in the Irish charts. The band Black 47 wrote and performed a song about Connolly that appears on their album Fire of Freedom. Irish singer-songwriter Niall Connolly has a song "May 12th, 1916 – A Song for James Connolly" on his album Dream Your Way Out of This One (2017). The song "Connolly Was There" is a popular Irish folk song celebrating Connolly's contributions to Unions in Ireland. A well known rendition was sung by Derek Warfield.
 In a 1972 interview on The Dick Cavett Show, John Lennon stated that James Connolly was an inspiration for his song, "Woman Is the Nigger of the World". Lennon quoted Connolly's 'the female is the slave of the slave' in explaining the feminist inspiration for the song.
 The Non-Stop Connolly show (1975), a 12-hour play on the life and politics of James Connolly written by John Arden and Margaretta D'Arcy. It was sometimes presented as a daily series and complete script reading, as in London in 1976 at the Almost Free Theatre Soho.
 Dunedin Connollys GFC, a Edinburgh, Scotland Gaelic Athletic Association (GAA) club founded in 1988, takes its name from his.
 The song "James Connolly" appears on the 1991 album Black 47 by the band Black 47. It celebrates his career as a socialist and Republican.
 In a 2002 BBC television production, 100 Greatest Britons where the British public were asked to register their vote, Connolly was voted in 64th place.

Memorials

There is a statue of James Connolly in Dublin, outside Liberty Hall, the offices of the SIPTU trade union. Another statue of Connolly stands in Union Park, Chicago near the offices of the UE union. There is a bust of Connolly in Troy, New York, in the park behind the statue of Uncle Sam. In March 2016 a statue of Connolly was unveiled by Department of Culture, Arts and Leisure minister Carál Ní Chuilín, and Connolly's great grandson, James Connolly Heron, on Falls Road in Belfast.

Connolly Station, one of the two main railway stations in Dublin, and Connolly Hospital, Blanchardstown, are named in his honour.

See also
James Connolly bibliography

Notes

References

Further reading

Writings
Connolly, James. 1987. Collected Works (Two volumes). Dublin: New Books.
Connolly, James. The Lost Writings (ed. Aindrias Ó Cathasaigh), London: Pluto Press 
Connolly, James. 1973. Selected Political Writings (eds. Owen Dudley Edwards & Bernard Ransom), London: Jonathan Cape
Connolly, James. 1948. Socialism and Nationalism: A Selection from the Writings of James Connolly (ed. Desmond Ryan), Dublin: Sign of the Three Candles.

Bibliography
 Allen, Kieran. 1990. The Politics of James Connolly, London: Pluto Press 
 Anderson, W.K. 1994. James Connolly and the Irish Left. Dublin: Irish Academic Press. .
 Collins, Lorcan. 2012. James Connolly. Dublin: O'Brien Press. .
 Fox, R.M. 1943. The History of the Irish Citizen Army. Dublin: James Duffy & Co.
 Fox, R.M. 1946. James Connolly: the forerunner. Tralee: The Kerryman.
 Kostick, Conor & Collins, Lorcan. 2000. The Easter Rising. Dublin: O'Brien Press 
 Lloyd, David. Rethinking national Marxism. James Connolly and ‘Celtic Communism’ Interventions: International Journal of Postcolonial Studies, 5:3, 345–370.
 Lynch, David. 2006. Radical Politics in Modern Ireland: A History of the Irish Socialist Republican Party (ISRP) 1896- 1904. Dublin: Irish Academic Press. .
 Nevin, Donal. 2005. James Connolly: A Full Life. Dublin: Gill & MacMillan. .
 O'Callaghan, Sean. 2015. James Connolly: My search for the Man, the Myth and his Legacy. 
 Ransom, Bernard. 1980. Connolly's Marxism, London: Pluto Press. .
 Strauss, Eric. 1973. Irish Nationalism and British Democracy, Westport CT: Greenwood. 
 Thompson, Spurgeon. "Gramsci and James Connolly: Anticolonial intersections", Interventions: International Journal of Postcolonial Studies, 5:3, 371-381

External links

 James Connolly archive at Marxists.org
 The Real Ideas of James Connolly
 James Connolly's grave, Arbour Hill, Irish Graves website
 IWW's Memorial Page for James Connolly
 1916 Walking Tour Site
 "The Relevance Of James Connolly in Ireland Today"  by George Gilmore
 "James Connolly & Irish Freedom: A Marxist Analysis" by G. Schuller
  by Niall Mulholland (CWI), 31 August 2002
 Film biopic of Connolly underway
 "James Connolly – A Marxist appreciation" (Spartacist League Dayschool)
 "Connolly is set for a heroic makeover on silver screen" by Kevin Myers
Connolly family from the 1911 Irish Census
Connolly images collated on the online Multitext pages of University College Cork
In Defence of Connolly

1868 births
1916 deaths
British political party founders
Executed participants in the Easter Rising
Executed revolutionaries
Executed writers
Industrial Workers of the World members
Irish Citizen Army members
Irish Esperantists
Irish Marxists
Irish anti–World War I activists
Irish political party founders
Irish republicans
Irish revolutionaries
Irish socialists
Irish socialist feminists
Irish soldiers in the British Army
Irish trade unionists
King's Regiment (Liverpool) soldiers
Members of the Socialist Labor Party of America
Members of the Socialist Party of America
Signatories of the Proclamation of the Irish Republic
Social Democratic Federation members
Socialist Labour Party (UK, 1903) members
Socialist League (UK, 1885) members
Syndicalists
Trade unionists from Edinburgh